Bigelow is a town in Perry County, Arkansas, United States. Located in Central Arkansas near the confluence of the Fourche La Fave River and Arkansas River, the community was incorporated in 1905 as Esau. Based largely on the timber industry, the town grew until the lumber mills were closed in 1920. The population was 329 at the 2000 census.

History

Bigelow did not exist by its current name until 1911, as it was formerly known as "Esau"—a community a few miles southwest of the present Bridge that grew to border the edge of the small town of Fourche. In 1911, Fourche River Mill owner, N.P. Bigelow, built an elaborate white house of the best lumber on a hill above the town. He was elected mayor, and then gained permission from the state's General Assembly to change the name of Esau to Bigelow. It was at one time the biggest town in the county; a vote was taken to move the county seat from Perryville to Bigelow, Bigelow won the vote, but the move was never made.

Geography
Bigelow is located at  (34.999061, -92.631203).

Demographics

As of the census of 2000, there were 329 people, 127 households, and 91 families residing in the town. The population density was 391.5 inhabitants per square mile (151.2/km2). The racial makeup of the town was 97.57% White, 0.61% Black or African American, 0.91% Native American, 0.61% Asian, and 0.30% from two or more races.  2.43% of the population were Hispanic or Latino of any race.

There were 127 households, out of which 33.9% had children under the age of 18 living with them, 55.9% were married couples living together, 12.6% had a female householder with no husband present, and 27.6% were non-families. 24.4% of all households were made up of individuals, and 16.5% had someone living alone who was 65 years of age or older.  The average household size was 2.59 and the average family size was 3.05.

In the town, the population was spread out, with 28.3% under the age of 18, 8.8% from 18 to 24, 27.1% from 25 to 44, 22.2% from 45 to 64, and 13.7% who were 65 years of age or older.  The median age was 36 years. For every 100 females, there were 89.1 males.  For every 100 females age 18 and over, there were 85.8 males.

The median income for a household in the town was $32,000, and the median income for a family was $47,750. Males had a median income of $27,500 versus $21,429 for females. The per capita income for the town was $16,574.  About 11.0% of families and 18.0% of the population were below the poverty line, including 32.1% of those under age 18 and 22.2% of those age 65 or over.

Education 
The school district for public education for elementary and secondary school students is the East End School District, which leads to graduation from Bigelow High School.

See also

References

Towns in Perry County, Arkansas
Towns in Arkansas
Populated places in Central Arkansas
Populated places established in 1905
1905 establishments in Arkansas